Statistics of Latvian Higher League in the 1967 season.

Overview
It was contested by 14 teams, and ESR won the championship.

League standings

Playoff
ESR 5-2 ASK

References
 RSSSF

Latvian SSR Higher League
Football 
Latvia